Hyperolius phantasticus is a species of frog in the family Hyperoliidae.
It is found in Cameroon, Central African Republic, Republic of the Congo, Democratic Republic of the Congo, Gabon, possibly Angola, and possibly Equatorial Guinea.
Its natural habitats are subtropical or tropical moist lowland forests, subtropical or tropical seasonally wet or flooded lowland grassland, freshwater marshes, intermittent freshwater marshes, rural gardens, heavily degraded former forest, and ponds.

References

phantasticus
Amphibians described in 1899
Taxonomy articles created by Polbot